Prince Ilia Chavchavadze (8 November 1837 – 12 September 1907) was a Georgian public figure, journalist, publisher,  writer and poet who spearheaded the revival of Georgian nationalism during the second half of the 19th century and ensured the survival of the Georgian language, literature, and culture during the last decades of Tsarist rule. He is Georgia's "most universally revered hero" and is regarded as the "Father of the Nation."

He was a leader of contemporary youth intellectual movement named "Tergdaleulebi". They spread modern and European liberal ideals in Georgia. Ilia Chavchavadze founded two modern newspapers: Sakartvelos Moambe and Iveria. He played an important role in the creation of the first financial structure in Georgia – Land Bank of Tbilisi. During 30 years he was a chairman of this Bank, through which he financed and promoted most of the cultural, educational, economical and charity events which took place in Georgia. 

Continuing the educational work begin in Constantinople by Fr. Peter Kharischirashvili and the Servites of the Immaculate Conception, Ilia Chavchavadze also participated in the foundation of "Society for the Spreading of Literacy among Georgians" – an organization that established schools that taught in the Georgian language. This was instrumental in halting the Russification policy of Russian Empire in Georgia.

Inspired by the contemporary liberal movements in Europe and Russia, as a writer and a public figure, Chavchavadze directed much of his efforts toward awakening national and liberal ideals among Georgians. Chavchavadze was the author of numerous articles that were published in his newspaper Iveria, as well as in other periodicals that were published in Georgia. In his articles, Chavchavadze discussed a number of topics, among them: national issues, literature, education, theater, politics, economics, current issues and events happening not just in Georgia, but around the world and especially in Europe. His views about self-government, judicial system, social issues, human rights, women's rights, economics, education and civic activism were modern and contributed much to the creation of Georgian sense of national identity, formation of civil society and also to intellectual and political discussions of his time. He was a devoted protector of the Georgian language and culture from Russification. He is considered the main contributor of Georgian cultural and civic nationalism.

During the 1905 Russian Revolution Chavchavadze was elected as a representative of the Georgian nobility to the imperial State Council. However, he stated that he would represent the whole nation, not just one particular social class. He advocated against capital punishment and lobbied for Georgian autonomy.

His most important literary works were: The Hermit, The Ghost, Otaraant Widow, Kako The Robber, Happy Nation, Letters of a Traveler and Is a man a human?!.

Chavchavadze was killed in Tsitsamuri, near Mtskheta, by a gang of assassins. Details of his murder are still matter of debate.  His legacy earned him the broad admiration of the Georgian people. In 1987 he was canonized as Saint Ilia the Righteous (tsminda ilia martali) by the Georgian Orthodox Church. Today, Georgians revere Chavchavadze as The Uncrowned King (ugvirgvino mepe) and the "Father of the Nation."

Life

Ancestry and early life 

Ilia Chavchavadze was born in Qvareli, a village in Kvareli, located in the Alazani Valley, in the Kakheti province of Georgia, which was part of the Russian Empire at that time. Ilia was a tavadi, the Georgian title of prince. It is thought that the noble Chavchavadze family came from the Pshav-Khevsureti region of Georgia, and, in 1726, King Constantine II granted the Chavchavadze family the rank of Prince in recognition of their knighthood and valor to the nation. This resulted in the family moving and settling in the Alazani Gorge in Kakheti.

Ilia was the third son of Grigol Chavchavadze and Mariam Beburishvili. Grigol, like his father and his famous ancestors, had a military background. He, along with the local militiamen protected the village from numerous Dagestani invasions. This can be seen in the architecture of the Ilia Chavchavadze museum house in Kvareli, incorporating a Medieval castle style in the two-storey castle in the yard, which was designed to protect the house during invasions.

Chavchavadze was educated at the elementary level by the deacon of the village before he moved to Tbilisi where he attended the prestigious Academy for Nobility in 1848. However, from an early age, Ilia was influenced by his parents who were highly educated in classical literature, Georgian history and poetry. From his parents, Ilia learned the inspiring stories of Georgian heroism in classical historical novels. In his autobiography, Ilia refers to his mother, Princess Mariam Chavchavadze, who knew most Georgian novels and poems by heart and encouraged her children to study them. Ilia also described the influence of the deacon's storytelling, which gave him an artistic inspiration, later applied in his novel writing.

Ilia's mother, Mariam, died on 4 May 1848, when Ilia was ten years old, and his father asked his sister, Makrine, to help bring up the children. Aunt Makrine had a significant impact on Ilia's life, because, after 1852, when Ilia's father Grigol died, she was the only remaining caretaker of the family.

In 1848, after the death of Princess Chavchavadze, Ilia was sent to Tbilisi by his father to begin his secondary education. Ilia attended a private school for three years before he entered the 1st Academy of Tbilisi in 1851. Soon after, Ilia's father died and Aunt Makrine looked after the family. His secondary school years were very stressful, due to his father's death. However, the Chavchavadze family suffered another devastating blow when Ilia's brother, Constantine, was killed during the Dagestani raid on Kakheti. Ilia expressed his anguish and grief in one of his first short-poems called Sorrow of a Poor Man. In addition to his personal problems, the political situation in Georgia worsened under the harsh authority of the Russian Empire, which played a destructive role to the nation and its culture.

Student years 

After graduating from the academy, Ilia decided to continue his education at the University of St. Petersburg, Russia. Before leaving for St. Petersburg, Ilia composed one of his most remarkable poems, To the Mountains of Kvareli in the village of Kardanakhi on 15 April 1857, in which he expressed his lifelong admiration for the Greater Caucasus Mountains and his sorrow at leaving his homeland.

That same year, Ilia was admitted to the University of St. Petersburg. During his student years, numerous revolutions sprang up in Europe which Ilia observed with great interest. Ilia's attention focused on the events in Italy and the struggle of Giuseppe Garibaldi, whom he admired for many years. While in St.Petersburg, Ilia met Princess Catherine Chavchavadze, from whom he learned about the poetry and lyrics of the Georgian romantic Prince Nik'oloz Baratashvili. Due to the harsh climate in St Petersburg, Ilia became very ill and returned to Georgia for several months in 1859.

Ilia finally returned to Georgia after the completion of his studies in 1861. During his journey back, Ilia wrote one of his greatest masterpieces, The Traveler's Diaries, in which he outlines the importance of nation-building and provides an allegorical comparison of Mt. Kazbegi and the Tergi River in the Khevi region of Georgia.

Political life 

Ilia's main political and social goals were based on Georgian nationalism. He urged nationwide resistance to the House of Romanov's policy of forced Russification, the revival of the Georgian language, and the cultivation of Georgian literature. Even more subversive from the State's perspective, Chavchavadze also pushed for reviving the independence of the Georgian Orthodox Church from the control of the Tsar and the Holy Synod and, most subversively, for Georgia's political independence. Both of these things had ended when Georgia had become part of the Russian Empire.

As the number of supporters for his ideas grew, so did opposition to Chavchavadze from both the Bolshevik and Menshevik factions of the Russian Social Democratic Labour Party, and particularly from Noe Zhordania. The SD's main aims were focused on toppling the Tsarist autocracy and upon an Atheist and Marxist transformation of a still unified Russian Empire. This did not include the revival of the Georgian Church, State, language, or of a distinctly Georgian identity. Ilia was viewed as bourgeois and as an old aristocrat who failed to realize the importance of the revolutionary and Atheist future.

In addition to his works described above, he was also the founder and chairman of many public, cultural and educational organizations (Society for the Spreading of Literacy Among Georgians, "The Bank of the Nobility", "The Dramatic Society", "The Historical-Ethnographical Society of Georgia", etc.). He was also a translator of British literature. His main literary works were translated and published in French, English, German, Polish, Ukrainian, Belarusian, Russian and other languages. Between 1906 and 1907, he was a member of the State Council (Gosudarstvennaya Duma) in Russia. His eclectic interests also led him to be a member of, among others, the Caucasian Committee of the Geographical Society of Russia, the Society of Ethnography and Anthropology of Moscow University, the Society of Orientalists of Russia and the Anglo-Russian Literary Society (London).

Prince Chavchavadze briefly acted as a literary mentor to a young Joseph Stalin, who was then an Orthodox seminarian in Tbilisi. According to historian Simon Sebag Montefiore, "The Prince was sufficiently impressed to show the teenagers work to his editors. He admired Stalin's verse, choosing five poems to publish – quite an achievement. Prince Chavchavadze called Stalin the 'young man with the burning eyes.'"

Death 

After serving as a member of the Upper House in the first Russian Duma, Ilia decided to return to Georgia in 1907. On 28 August 1907, while travelling with his wife Olga from Tbilisi to Saguramo, Prince Ilia Chavchavadze was ambushed and murdered by a crew of six assassins in the small village of Tsitsamuri, near Mtskheta.

The Prince's murder was seen as a national tragedy and was mourned by all classes of Georgian society. Prince Akaki Tsereteli, who was suffering from serious health problems at the time, spoke at the funeral and dedicated an outstanding oration to Ilia: "Ilia's inestimable contribution to the revival of the Georgian nation is an example for future generations".

Theories
The assassination of Ilia Chavchavadze remains controversial today. Although the Soviet Government later accused the Tsarist secret police, or Okhrana, of ordering the assassination, at the time, the most "widely held suspicion" laid his murder at the door of the Bolshevik faction of the Russian Social Democratic Labour Party. Chavchavadze had publicly and very successfully undermined the growth of both factions of the Social Democratic Labour Party. Furthermore, Prince Chavchavadze's Orthodox Christian and socially conservative vision for Georgian nationalism and his enormous popularity and influence upon the Georgian people may have been additional causes. Historian Simon Sebag Montefiore suspects, while Prince Chavchavadze's assassination may have been a rare instance of cooperation between the Bolshevik and Menshevik factions of the SDLP, that Joseph Stalin may have been at least tangentially involved in the murder of his former publisher and literary mentor. According to Montefiore,

Legacy 

As a result of Chavchavadze's death, the Georgian Social Democrats, especially the Mensheviks, started to gain significant power and support among the Georgian people. Eventually, after the temporary disengagement of Russia from Transcaucasia, Georgian Mensheviks decided to revive Georgian statehood and proclaimed the independence on 26 May 1918. After the Soviet invasion of Georgia and the nation's annexation into the Soviet Union in 1921, Chavchavadze became for Georgian nationalists the symbol of Georgian freedom and national liberation.

In 1987, Chavchavadze was formally canonized by the Georgian Orthodox and Apostolic Church, as "Saint Ilia the Righteous."

In October 1987 the Ilia Chavchavadze Society, an organisation that promoted Georgian cultural revival and political autonomy, was established by Soviet dissident intellectuals.

In 1989, during the anti-Soviet protests in Tbilisi, the poems, novels and political beliefs of Prince Ilia Chavchavadze became a driving force behind the Georgian struggle for independence.

The idea of national revival, which Chavchavadze preached and advocated in various Georgian societies throughout his life, gained momentum in 1990. In 2002, Mikheil Saakashvili created the United National Movement party which claimed the political legacy of Ilia Chavchavadze, and which played a major role in the Rose Revolution of 2003 which ousted Pro-Russian President Eduard Shevardnadze.

In 1998 Stephen Kinzer wrote about the widespread admiration of Chavchavadze across the political spectrum: "Today leftists in Georgia embrace Chavchavadze for his hatred of injustice, centrists love him for his nonviolent humanism, and right-wing nationalists have adopted his slogan Motherland, Language, Faith."

Published works 
 Georgian Poetry: Rustaveli to Galaktion: A Bilingual Anthology. Translations by Lyn Coffin, with the assistance of Gia Jokhadze, featuring an introduction by Dodona Kiziria. Slavica, Bloomington, Indiana, 2013.
 Georgische Dichter. Translated and compiled by Arthur Leist, Dresden-Leipzig, 1887 (Poems of Ilia Chavchavadze and other Georgian poets, in German)
 The Hermit by Prince Ilia Chavchavadze. Translated from the Georgian by Marjory Wardrop, London: Bernard Quaritch, 1895

See also 

 Chavchavadze
 List of Georgian writers
 History of Georgia
 Ilia State University

References

Citations

Sources

Resources 
 Baron de Baie: Au nord de la chaine du Caucase souvenirs d'une mission", Paris, 1899 (in French)
 Baron de Baie: Tiflis souvenirs d'une mission, Paris, 1900 (in French)
 Companjen, Françoise J., "Between Tradition and Modernity". Amsterdam 2004, pp. 167–171 (in English)
 Leist, Arthur: Das georgische Volk, Dresden, 1903 (in German)
 Lehman-Haupt, C.F. : Reisen und Forschungen, Berlin, 1910, pp. 106–111 (in German)
 Reisner, Oliver: The Tergdaleulebi: Founders of Georgian National Identity. In: Ladislaus Löb, István Petrovics, György E. Szonyi (eds.): Forms of Identity: Definitions and Changes. Attila Jozsef University, Szeged 1994, pp. 125–37
 Wardrop, Oliver The Kingdom of Georgia, London, 1888, pp. 150–152

 External links 

 Sharadze, Guram (ed., 1987).Ilia Chavchavadze works, translated by Marjory and Oliver Wardrops''. Tbilisi: Ganatleba, 1987. Online version at NPLG.

1837 births
1907 deaths
19th-century writers from the Russian Empire
19th-century novelists
19th-century poets from Georgia (country)
19th-century writers from Georgia (country)
20th-century Christian saints
20th-century writers from Georgia (country)
Assassinated activists
Assassinated politicians from Georgia (country)
Burials at Mtatsminda Pantheon
Christian poets
Historical novelists from Georgia (country)
Male poets from Georgia (country)
Nationalists from Georgia (country)
Nobility of Georgia (country)
Russian princes
People murdered in Georgia (country)
Politicians from Georgia (country)
Politicians of the Russian Empire
Saints of Georgia (country)
Unsolved murders in the Russian Empire
1907 murders in the Russian Empire